Ervin is a surname.  Notable people with the name include:

Andrew Ervin (born 1971), American novelist and critic
Anthony Ervin (born 1981), American swimmer
Bill Ervin, retired NASCAR Grand National Series driver
Booker Ervin (1930–1970), American musician
Clark Ervin, American government official
David Ervin (born 1961), American musician
Frankie Ervin (1926-2009), American musician
Gary Ervin (born 1983), American basketball player
Howard M. Ervin (1915–2009), American scholar and pastor
James Ervin (politician) (1778–1841), American politician
Jason Ervin, American politician
Joseph Wilson Ervin (1901–1945), American politician
Lauren Ervin (born 1985), American basketball player
Lisa Ervin (born 1977), American former figure skater
Lorenzo Kom'boa Ervin (born 1947), African-American activist
Mallory Ervin (born 1985), American beauty pageant winner
Phillip Ervin (born 1992), American baseball player
Richard Ervin (1905–2004), American jurist
Robert Tait Ervin (1863–1949), American jurist
S. H. Ervin, philanthropist
Sam Ervin (1896–1985), American politician
Sam J. Ervin IV (born 1955), American jurist
Samuel James Ervin III (1926–1999), American jurist
Tom Ervin (born 1952), American attorney and politician
Tyler Ervin (born 1993), American football player
William S. Ervin (1886-1951), American lawyer and politician
Winfield Ervin, Jr. (1902–1985), American politician

See also
 Earvin
 Ervin (disambiguation)
 Ervin (given name)
 Ervine
 Erving (disambiguation)
 Erwan
 Erwin (disambiguation)
 Irvin
 Irvine
 Irving (disambiguation)
 Irwin (disambiguation)